Liu Wang (born 25 March 1969) is a Chinese pilot selected as part of the Shenzhou program. He was born in the Shanxi province of China and was a fighter pilot in the People's Liberation Army Air Force. He was selected to be an astronaut in 1998.

Career
Liu Wang was selected to be part of the crew of Shenzhou 9, the first crewed mission to the first Chinese space station, Tiangong 1. Also on the mission is Jing Haipeng, the first Chinese repeat space traveller, and the first Chinese female astronaut, Liu Yang.

References

External links

Liu Wang at the Encyclopedia Astronautica. Accessed 23 July 2005.
Spacefacts biography of Liu Wang

1969 births
Living people
Shenzhou program astronauts
People's Liberation Army Astronaut Corps
People's Liberation Army Air Force personnel